Executive Order 13303 was issued on May 22, 2003, by United States President George W. Bush to protect the Development Fund for Iraq for the rebuilding of Iraq from any legal attachments or liens.  Further, it protects Iraqi oil products and interests and ownership by US persons (defined to include US corporations) from attachment as well.  Executive Order 13303 also terminates sanctions specified in EO 12722, EO 12724, EO 13290, as it applies to the development fund.  In effect, EO 13303 provides an extraordinarily broad legal shield for any and all contractors and mercenaries working in Iraq on behalf of US corporations in any oil related enterprise.

The order's full title is Executive Order Protecting the Development Fund for Iraq and Certain Other Property in Which Iraq Has An Interest.

Effects of EO 13303
The primary effect of EO 13303 is the legal protection of US oil companies.  EO 13303 is part of a broader endeavor by the Bush administration to exert control over Iraqi oil revenues.  The plan centers on the Development Fund for Iraq, created by the United Nations and nominally controlled by the United States, with advice from the World Bank and the International Monetary Fund (IMF).  The second part of the plan is EO 13303, providing absolute legal protection for US interests in Iraqi oil.

Controversy
Critics of EO 13303 contend new debt for Iraq will accrue from the new Development Fund for Iraq.  They say that it will allow opportunities for grave abuses because it offers little illuminating context and its tone suggests the language should be read quite broadly.  These concerns stem from the apparent likelihood the fund will be used to leverage US government and corporate interests.

The United Nations Security Council approved Resolution 1483 on May 22, 2003, ending economic sanctions against Iraq while clearing a path for the transfer of over $1 billion from the Oil-for-Food program as seed money for establishment of the development fund.  Critics are also alarmed because all proceeds from the sale of Iraqi oil and natural gas are to be placed into the fund, noting developing countries have amassed huge debts in exchange for selling out their natural resources to powerful corporations.  This paradigm, they contend, cloaks corporate welfare and neocolonialism in terms of 'poverty alleviation', and now in Iraq as 'humanitarian assistance'.

There are differences between the original text (UN Security Council Resolution 1483) and EO 13303, which may lead a court to hold implementation is overbroad.

See also
 KPMG audit of the Development Fund for Iraq
 Downing Street memo
 List of national emergencies in the United States

References

Online versions of EO 13303
 Executive Order 13303: Protecting the Development Fund for Iraq and Certain Other Property in Which Iraq Has An Interest, May 22, 2003, the White House Archives 
 AkamaiTech.net (pdf) - 'Executive Order 13303: Protecting the Development Fund for Iraq and Certain Other Property in Which Iraq Has an Interest' signed May 22, 2003, Federal Register 
 ReclaimDemocracy.org - 'Executive Order 13303: Protecting the Development Fund for Iraq and Certain Other Property in Which Iraq Has an Interest' signed May 22, 2003, the Federal Register (May 28, 2003)

External links

 UN resolution 1483, May 22, 2003
 EarthRights.org - 'Outrageous Bush Executive Order on Iraq Oil Must Be Investigated' (July 28, 2003)
 EarthRights.org - 'EarthRights International examines EO 13303 for possible illegality' (September 22, 2003)
 GreenNet.org - 'UN resolution could give Halliburton permanent immunity in Iraq', Jim Vallette (June 4, 2004)
 TomPaine.com - 'Operation Oil Immunity', Steve Kretzmann, Jim Vallette (May 7, 2004)
 WSWS.org - 'Bush grants permanent legal immunity to US corporations looting Iraqi oil'. Rick Kelly, World Socialist Web Site (August 19, 2003)

13303
2003 in American law
2003 in the United States